State Route 205 (SR 205) is a primary state highway in the U.S. state of Virginia. The state highway runs  from SR 3 at Purkins Corner east to SR 3 at Oak Grove. SR 205 connects several small communities in eastern King George County and northwestern Westmoreland County. The state highway also passes through the Potomac River resort of Colonial Beach, where the highway has a spur, State Route 205Y (SR 205Y).

Route description

SR 205 begins at an intersection with SR 3 (Kings Highway) at Purkins Corner a short distance to the east of King George, the county seat of King George County. The state highway heads east as Ridge Road, which follows the height of land between the Upper Machodic Creek watershed to the north and Pine Hill Creek to the south. SR 205 intersects U.S. Route 301 (James Madison Parkway) at Edgehill and passes through Carruthers Corner and Alden. The state highway continues through Ninde before it descends from the ridge to meet the eastern end of SR 218 (Tetotum Road) south of Tetotum just before crossing Pine Hill Creek into Westmoreland County. Just south of the creek, SR 205 meets the northern end of SR 631 (Longfield Road), which functions as a bypass of Colonial Beach.

SR 205 curves northeast to approach the Potomac River shoreline, where the highway crosses Goldman Creek into the town of Colonial Beach. The state highway curves southeast as McKinney Boulevard and passes through the Potomac Beach section of town while running a short distance within the town limits. A short distance north of Monroe Bay, SR 205 has a Y-shaped intersection with SR 205Y (Colonial Avenue). SR 205 curves southwest and exits the town as James Monroe Highway, which passes through Monroe Hall, the site of James Monroe's birthplace. The state highway meets the southern end of SR 631 (Longfield Road) and crosses Mattox Creek at Mattox Bridge. SR 205 reaches its eastern terminus at SR 3 (Kings Highway) at Oak Grove next to St. Peter's Episcopal Church.

Major intersections

References

External links

Virginia Highways Project: VA 205

205
State Route 205
State Route 205